Auckland Metropolitan College was a state coeducational alternative secondary school located in the suburb of Mount Eden in Auckland, New Zealand.

It was closed in 2001 by the Minister of Education.

See also
Auckland Girls' Grammar School

References

Alternative schools
Secondary schools in Auckland
1977 establishments in New Zealand
Educational institutions established in 1977
2001 disestablishments in New Zealand
Educational institutions disestablished in 2001